The 2010 Toppserien was the twenty-fourth season of top-tier women's football in Norway since its establishment in 1987. A total of twelve teams contested the league, consisting of ten who competed in the previous season and two promoted from the 1. divisjon. The season ran from 5 April to 11 November 2010, and was won by Stabæk, their first ever title. As champions, they also qualified for the Round of 32 of the 2011-12 UEFA Women's Champions League.

Stabæk completed the entire season undefeated, and were confirmed as league champions on the penultimate day after beating Trondheims-Ørn 3–0, at the same time as runners-up Røa lost 0–4 to Kolbotn. The roles were thus reversed from the previous season, when Røa won the league ahead of Stabæk. Kolbotn once again finished third after winning 2–0 against Arna-Bjørnar in the final round.

Fløya were the first team of the season to be relegated, on 30 October. They would have been joined by newcomers Donn, whose licensing application for the 2011 season was denied on 4 November for financial reasons. Those same reasons, however, lead to Donn being declared bankrupt six days later.

Linderud-Grei, founded in 2006 by Linderud IL and SF Grei to promote women's football in Groruddalen, played in the top flight for the first time. They finished second to last in the standings, but retained their Toppserien spot because of Donn's bankruptcy and demotion. It was the first time since 2007 that a newly promoted team had avoided relegation.

As of 2010, the women's football club Team Strømmen are affiliated with Lillestrøm SK and have changed their name to LSK Kvinner. This is the second instance in Norway of a leading women's club becoming affiliated with a leading men's club, the first occurring in 2009 when Asker Fotball relocated to Bærum and became Stabæk Fotball.

League table

Results

Top goalscorers

See also
2010 in Norwegian football

References

Toppserien seasons
Top level Norwegian women's football league seasons
1
Norway
Norway